Travis Norton Denker (born August 5, 1985) is an American former professional baseball infielder. He played in Major League Baseball (MLB) for the San Francisco Giants.

Prior to playing professional baseball, Denker attended Brea Olinda High School.

Professional career

Los Angeles Dodgers
Originally drafted by the Los Angeles Dodgers in the 21st round of the 2003 Major League Baseball Draft, Denker signed and started his professional career that very same year. He split time between the South Georgia Waves and GCL Dodgers, combining to hit .264 with three home runs and 14 RBI in 46 games.

Denker spent the entire 2004 season with the Ogden Raptors, with whom he hit .311 with 12 home runs and 43 RBI in 57 games. In 2005, he split time between the Columbus Catfish and Vero Beach Dodgers, combining to hit .281 with 23 home runs and 77 RBI in 132 games. He split time again between the two teams in 2006, hitting .247 with 16 home runs and 70 RBI in 129 games. He also walked 89 times and struck out 73 times.

San Francisco Giants
He spent most of the 2007 season with the Inland Empire 66ers until the Dodgers traded him to the Giants on August 25, 2007, as the PTBNL from a trade for Mark Sweeney on August 9, 2007. Denker finished the season playing for the Giants High-A affiliate, the San Jose Giants and helped lead them to the California League championship. For the year, Denker hit .300 with 11 home runs and 66 RBI in 118 games.

Denker was called up on May 12, and got his first major league hit against the Florida Marlins on May 25, 2008, which was a double down the third base line. He hit his first home run against Scott Schoeneweis of the New York Mets on June 3, 2008.

San Diego Padres/Boston Red Sox
After spending the rest of the 2008 season in the minor leagues, Denker was claimed off waivers by the San Diego Padres.  He appeared in only one game for the AA San Antonio Missions.

On April 14, 2009, the Boston Red Sox claimed Denker off waivers from the Padres. He appeared in 117 games for the Pawtucket Red Sox, hitting .238.

Los Angeles Dodgers
He signed a minor league contract with Seattle Mariners for 2010 season, but he was released April 24, 2010 after only 7 games with the Tacoma Rainiers and signed by the Los Angeles Dodgers on May 4.

In 2010, he played in 74 games for the Inland Empire 66ers of San Bernardino, 16 games for the Chattanooga Lookouts and 13 games for the Albuquerque Isotopes.

In 2011, he was in 55 games for the Rancho Cucamonga Quakes and 66 for the Lookouts. Combined he hit .274 with 25 home runs and 81 RBI. In 2012, he continued with the Lookouts, appearing in 64 games and hitting only .228. He was released on July 27.

Independent leagues
Denker signed with the Lancaster Barnstormers on August 4, 2012. He played with them through 2013 and then signed with the Laredo Lemurs of the American Association of Independent Professional Baseball.

He led the American Association in home runs while with the Laredo Lemurs.

Arizona Diamondbacks
On June 11, 2016 the Arizona Diamondbacks signed Denker to a minor league contract. On June 12, 2016 he was assigned to the Mobile BayBears. During the 2016 offseason, Denker signed a new minor league contract with the Diamondbacks.

References

External links

1985 births
Living people
Albuquerque Isotopes players
American expatriate baseball players in Mexico
Baseball players from California
Broncos de Reynosa players
Chattanooga Lookouts players
Columbus Catfish players
Connecticut Defenders players
Fresno Grizzlies players
Gulf Coast Dodgers players
Inland Empire 66ers of San Bernardino players
Lancaster Barnstormers players
Laredo Lemurs players
Major League Baseball second basemen
Major League Baseball third basemen
Mexican League baseball first basemen
Mexican League baseball second basemen
Mobile BayBears players
Ogden Raptors players
Pawtucket Red Sox players
People from Fountain Valley, California
Rancho Cucamonga Quakes players
San Antonio Missions players
San Francisco Giants players
San Jose Giants players
South Georgia Waves players
Sportspeople from Orange County, California
Sugar Land Skeeters players
Tacoma Rainiers players
Vero Beach Dodgers players